Shakti is a 2019 Argentine-Chilean short film written and directed by Martín Rejtman. The film premiered at the 69th Berlin International Film Festival on 9 February 2019, where it was nominated for best short film. It was Rejtman's first short film project in over thirty years.

Plot summary
Fede, is in his mid-twenties and lives alone in a Buenos Aires apartment. He splits up with his girlfriend, Magda on the say that his grandmother dies. He then meets a new love interest, Shakti and invites her to dinner. Rejtman explained that the film is about "a Jewish young man, the death of his grandmother, depression, Hare Krishnas, Pesach (Passover), and potato knishes."

Cast
Ignacio Solmonese as Fede
Laura Visconti as Shakti
Susana Pampín as Fede's psychologist
Valentina Posleman  as Magda
Pablo Moseinco as Padre Fede
Emma Luisa Rivero as Delia
Patricio Penna as Ulises
Miel Bargman as female client at psychologist's practice
Alejandra Flechner as Beatriz

References

External links
 

2010s Spanish-language films
2019 films
Argentine short films
Films shot in Argentina
Films about Jews and Judaism
Films directed by Martín Rejtman
Chilean short films